Ooperipatellus parvus is a species of velvet worm in the family Peripatopsidae. This species has 14 pairs of legs. It is found in South Australia.

References

Further reading

Onychophorans of Australasia
Onychophoran species
Animals described in 1996